Ismael Zacarias is a 1994 Philippine action film co-edited and directed by Toto Natividad. The film stars Edu Manzano, who wrote the story, as the title role. It was one of the entries in the 1994 Manila Film Festival, which spurred controversy where Edu Manzano was supposed to win as Best Actor.

Cast
 Edu Manzano as Lt. Ismael Zacarias
 Eddie Gutierrez as Don Pablo Lleva
 Plinky Recto as Rona
 Roi Vinzon as Enrique Lleva
 Alfred Manal as Tinoy
 Ramon Christopher as Edmund Lleva
 Dencio Padilla as Bugaloo
 Jaime Fabregas as Mr. Tanchoco
 Roldan Aquino as Maj. Roxas
 Dindo Arroyo as Ricky Boy
 Manjo del Mundo as Gomez
 Renato Robles as Col. Guevarra
 Renato del Prado as Pol
 Edwin Reyes as Eddie
 Dido dela Paz as Capt. Castro
 Jordan Castillo as Dindo
 Pocholo Montes as Col. Ravalo
 Cris Daluz as Kabise
 Ross Rival as Lolo
 Bebeng Amora as Snatcher
 Henry Nadong as Bartender

Awards

References

External links

1994 films
1994 action films
Filipino-language films
Philippine action films
Moviestars Production films
Films directed by Toto Natividad